The 2008–09 A1 Grand Prix of Nations, Great Britain was an A1 Grand Prix race  at Brands Hatch, England. It was set to be the final race of the 2008-09 A1 Grand Prix season, but became the season finale, due to the cancellation of the Mexican round due to the 2009 swine flu pandemic. Ultimately, it would be the last race for A1GP as bankruptcy followed later in the year.

A1 Team Ireland became the fourth A1 Grand Prix champions, with a double pole position, and double victory, to take Ireland's first international motor racing championship.

Title Battle 
With the British round now becoming the season finale, this left the championship in a three-way battle for the title.

Switzerland lead going into the event with 88 points, with four points to drop; followed by Ireland with 86, and Portugal with 82. The Netherlands are currently too far behind to win the title with 66 points, as even though 27 points are on offer for maximum score, the team has to drop 6 points from their worst event.

Also, even if all the teams finish equal of points, the tie-breaker rules would come into play. Currently Switzerland would win the title with four wins, to Ireland's three, and Portugal's one.

Drivers

Qualifying 

† Team utilized Powerboost "joker" qualifying lap.

Sprint Race

Feature Race

Notes 
 It was the 39th race weekend (78 starts).
 It was the fourth race to be held in Great Britain at Brands Hatch, as well as the third time the track has hosted the season finale.
 It was the first race as main driver for  J. R. Hildebrand and  Aaron Lim.
 It was the first race as rookie driver for  Aaron Steele.
  Ireland scored their second double pole-position of the season, and the only double win of the season.

References

External links 

2008–09 A1 Grand Prix season
2009 in British motorsport